The Abandoned Well is a 1913 American short silent Western film featuring Harry Carey.

Plot 
From his hard and lonely life with his foster father, the adopted son finds solace in Cynthia, the neighbor's daughter. Father promises to give them money to start their happy married way, but forgets when a widow, with a little girl, comes home with him as a bride. Then it is that the abandoned well comes into play and father's eyes are opened to his neglect.

Cast
 Harry Carey as The Adopted Son
 Claire McDowell as The Widow

See also
 List of American films of 1913
 Harry Carey filmography

References

External links
 

1913 films
1913 short films
1913 Western (genre) films
American silent short films
American black-and-white films
Films directed by Oliver L. Sellers
Silent American Western (genre) films
1910s American films
1910s English-language films